Lucina Juliana von der Heyde  (born 24 January 1997) is an Argentine field hockey player and who plays as midfielder for German club Mannheimer HC.

She was part of the Argentine team at the 2016 Summer Olympics in Rio de Janeiro. At the 2018 Hockey Stars Awards, she was named the FIH Rising Star of the Year. In 2019 she took a break from the national team.

References

External links
 

1997 births
Living people
Olympic field hockey players of Argentina
Argentine female field hockey players
Field hockey players at the 2016 Summer Olympics
Argentine people of German descent
Las Leonas players
People from Posadas, Misiones
Female field hockey midfielders
Mannheimer HC players
Feldhockey Bundesliga (Women's field hockey) players
Sportspeople from Misiones Province